Povondra is a Czech language surname. It may refer to:

František Povondra,  major character from the War with the Newts science fiction novel by Karel Čapek
Pavel Povondra,  Czech mineralogist, the namesake of povondraite
 (1786-1832), rector (1820) of the Olomouc Liceum (now Palacký University of Olomouc)

Czech-language surnames

cs:Povondra